The Keio Medical Science Prize (Japanese: 慶應医学賞) is a Japanese prize in medical sciences.

Introduction
The prize is awarded to scientists who made significant contributions to the field of medical sciences or life sciences. And these contributions can further promote the peace and prosperity of mankind and human society.

The prize award is 20 million Japanese Yen (approximately 180,000 US$). A medal is also awarded to the winner. Every year maximum two winners are awarded. A prize ceremony is held every year normally at Keio University, Tokyo, Japan.

Awardees
Source: Keio University

 1996 – Stanley B. Prusiner and Shigetada Nakanishi
 1997 – Robert A. Weinberg and Tadatsugu Taniguchi
 1998 – Moses Judah Folkman and 
 1999 – Elizabeth Helen Blackburn and Shinya Yoshikawa
 2000 – Arnold J. Levine and Yusuke Nakamura
 2001 – Tony Hunter and Masatoshi Takeichi
 2002 – Barry Marshall and Koichi Tanaka
 2003 – Ronald M. Evans and 
 2004 – Roger Y. Tsien
 2005 – 
 2006 – Thomas A. Steitz
 2007 – Brian J. Druker and Hiroaki Mitsuya
 2008 – Fred H. Gage and Shimon Sakaguchi
 2009 – Jeffrey M. Friedman and 
 2010 – Jules A. Hoffmann and Shizuo Akira 
 2011 – Philip A. Beachy and 
 2012 – Steven Rosenberg and 
 2013 – Victor Ambros and Shigekazu Nagata 
 2014 – Karl Deisseroth and 
 2015 – Jeffrey I. Gordon and Yoshinori Ohsumi
 2016 – Svante Pääbo and Tasuku Honjo
 2017 – John Edgar Dick and Seiji Ogawa
 2018 – Feng Zhang and Masashi Yanagisawa
 2019 – Hans C. Clevers and Tadamitsu Kishimoto
 2020 – Aviv Regev, Atsushi Miyawaki
 2021 – Katalin Karikó, Osamu Nureki

See also
 Keio University
 Lasker Awards
 Gairdner Foundation Wightman Award
 Wolf Prize in Medicine
 List of medicine awards

References

External links
 The Keio Medical Science Prize Homepage

Japanese science and technology awards
Medicine awards